Abdulrahman Hassan Al-Shammari (Arabic: عبد الرحمن حسن الشمري) is a football player, who plays as a right back in Saudi Arabia.

He joined Al-Nasr in the Winter of 2015, having left the Al-Tai club of Ha'il.

References

Living people
Saudi Arabian footballers
1989 births
Al-Tai FC players
Al-Orobah FC players
Al Nassr FC players
Ettifaq FC players
Al-Taawoun FC players
Al-Raed FC players
Al-Rawdhah Club players
Saudi First Division League players
Saudi Professional League players
Saudi Second Division players
Association football fullbacks